Lake Meadows is a park in Billericay, Essex, England. It is the site of many local events, including Billericay Fireworks and small-scale concerts. The Billericay fireworks are the largest firework display in Essex. As a concert venue, Lake Meadows has a capacity of 5,000.

There is 40 acres of parkland, fishing lakes and golf apparatus as well as a cafe, which is open from April to October.

The Friends of Lake Meadows are a voluntary organisation working with Basildon Council, Billericay Town Council and the Billericay community to promote public interest in the mark and help maintain it.

References

Borough of Basildon
Parks and open spaces in Essex
Billericay